is a train station in Niimi, Okayama Prefecture, Japan. It is a passenger railway station in the city of Kiryū, Gunma, Japan, operated by the private railway operator Jōmō Electric Railway Company. Niisato Station was opened on November 10, 1928 as Takei Station (武井駅, Takei-eki). It was renamed to its present name on May 1, 1948. A new station building was completed on March 27, 1998.

Train Lines 
Niisato Station is a station on the Jōmō Line, and is located 15.8 kilometers from the terminus of the line at Chūō-Maebashi.
West Japan Railway Company
Hakubi Line

Layout
Niisato Station has two opposed side platforms connected by a level crossing.

Passenger statistics 
In fiscal 2019, the station was used by an average of 371 passengers daily (boarding passengers only).

Adjacent stations

References

Hakubi Line
Railway stations in Okayama Prefecture
Railway stations in Japan opened in 1953